Joan Florence Page-Allison OBE (born 10 June 1947) is a retired British international middle-distance runner.

Athletics career
She competed in the women's 800 metres at the 1968 Summer Olympics.

She represented England and won a silver medal in the 1,500 metres, at the 1970 British Commonwealth Games in Edinburgh, Scotland.

Four years later she won a second silver medal in the 1,500 metres and finished fourth in the 800 metres at the 1974 British Commonwealth Games in Christchurch, New Zealand.

She was appointed Officer of the Order of the British Empire (OBE) in the 1995 Birthday Honours for services to athletics.

References

1947 births
Living people
Athletes (track and field) at the 1968 Summer Olympics
Athletes (track and field) at the 1972 Summer Olympics
Athletes (track and field) at the 1974 British Commonwealth Games
British female middle-distance runners
Olympic athletes of Great Britain
Athletes from London
Commonwealth Games medallists in athletics
Athletes (track and field) at the 1970 British Commonwealth Games
Commonwealth Games silver medallists for England
Officers of the Order of the British Empire
Medallists at the 1970 British Commonwealth Games